The 1970 DFB-Pokal Final decided the winner of the 1969–70 DFB-Pokal, the 27th season of Germany's knockout football cup competition. It was played on 29 August 1970 at the Niedersachsenstadion in Hanover. Kickers Offenbach won the match 2–1 against 1. FC Köln, to claim their 1st cup title.

Route to the final
The DFB-Pokal began with 32 teams in a single-elimination knockout cup competition. There were a total of four rounds leading up to the final. Teams were drawn against each other, and the winner after 90 minutes would advance. If still tied, 30 minutes of extra time was played. If the score was still level, a replay would take place at the original away team's stadium. If still level after 90 minutes, 30 minutes of extra time was played. If the score was still level, a drawing of lots would decide who would advance to the next round.

Note: In all results below, the score of the finalist is given first (H: home; A: away).

Match

Details

Notes

References

External links
 Match report at kicker.de 
 Match report at WorldFootball.net
 Match report at Fussballdaten.de 

1. FC Köln matches
Kickers Offenbach matches
1969–70 in German football cups
1970
Sports competitions in Hanover
20th century in Hanover
August 1970 sports events in Europe